Stuart M. Turnbull is Professor Emeritus, the Bauer College of Business at the University of Houston. Stuart has authored over sixty academic papers in the areas of financial economics, law and economics, and the general area of derivatives. He is currently an associate editor Journal of Credit Risk and the International Journal of Theoretical and Applied Finance. He was the editor of the Journal of Credit Risk and an associate editor of the Journal of Derivatives, Journal of Finance and Mathematical Finance.  

He is a member of the Advisory Board of the International Review of Applied Financial Issues and Economics, and the International Review of Banking and Financial Studies. He is an individual member of the Centre for Financial Industries, the Fields Institute. He has published two books on derivatives. His current research is focused on (a) pricing credit risky securities, (b) the impact of news on the price dynamics of oil futures and (c) pricing contracts in commodity markets.

He was a Senior Vice President, Fixed Income Research, Lehman Brothers, New York. Prior to joining Lehman Brothers, he was Vice President, Risk Management Division, Canadian Imperial Bank of Commerce, Toronto, Ontario.  He was the Bank of Montreal Chair of Banking and Finance and Professor of Economics at Queen’s University and Professor of Economics, University of Toronto. 

He holds a Ph.D. in Financial Economics from the University of British Columbia, a M.Sc. and DIC in Statistics and Operational Research and a B.Sc. and ARCS in Physics from the Imperial College of Science and Technology (London, U. K.).

External links
Profile, bauer.edu
SSRN Page

Financial economists
University of Houston faculty
Alumni of Imperial College London
University of British Columbia alumni
Academic staff of the University of Toronto
Academic staff of Queen's University at Kingston
1947 births
Living people
Lehman Brothers people
Canadian Imperial Bank of Commerce people